Franklin Township School District can refer to:

Franklin Township School District (Hunterdon County, New Jersey)
Franklin Township School District (Warren County, New Jersey)